USS Alkaid (AK-114) was a , converted from a Liberty Ship, commissioned by the US Navy for service in World War II. She was first named after William G. Sumner, a classical liberal American social scientist. She was renamed and commissioned after Alkaid, a star in the Big Dipper asterism or constellation Ursa Major. She was responsible for delivering troops, goods and equipment to locations in the war zone.

Construction

William G. Sumner was laid down on 13 September 1943, under a Maritime Commission (MARCOM) contract, MC hull 1211, by the St. Johns River Shipbuilding Company, Jacksonville, Florida; she was sponsored by Mrs. William R. McQuaid, a prominent citizen of Jacksonville, and launched on 8 November 1943. She was acquired by the US Navy, under a bareboat charter on 19 November 1943, and renamed Alkaid. She was converted for naval service by the Gibbs Gas Engine Co., Jacksonville, and commissioned in Jacksonville, on 27 March 1944.

Service history

Following a period of shakedown training off the US East Coast, Alkaid sailed on 6 May 1944, for the Pacific Ocean, via Guantanamo Bay, Cuba, and the Panama Canal. On 14 June, the ship touched at Espiritu Santo and reported to Service Squadron 8 for duty.

For the duration of her World War II service, Alkaid acted as an interisland transport. Some of the ports she visited included Noumea, New Caledonia; Guadalcanal; Tulagi; Suva, Fiji; Auckland and Wellington, New Zealand; Efate, New Hebrides; Oro Bay, New Guinea; Iwo Jima; Guam; and Eniwetok.

On 15 May 1945, Alkaid sailed from Ulithi, with a convoy bound for Okinawa. She arrived off Hagushi beach on 21 May, and operated there through the end of the month.

Alkaid touched at Pearl Harbor in early August. She was undergoing availability when she received word of the Japanese surrender. In September, the ship got underway for Japan. After making calls at Eniwetok, Saipan, and Iwo Jima, Alkaid dropped anchor at Yokosuka, Japan, on 4 October. For the next one and one-half months, the ship served with the occupation forces in Japan.

On 16 November, Alkaid left Japan with a load of homeward-bound American troops and reached Long Beach, California, on 9 December 1945. On 4 January 1946, Alkaid departed Long Beach for San Francisco, California, arriving on 6 January 1946.

Decommissioning

The ship was decommissioned there and returned to the Maritime Commission (MARCOM) on 11 March 1946, and entered the Suisun Bay Reserve Fleet at Suisun Bay, California. Alkaid was stricken from the Navy list on 28 March 1946.

Resuming the name William G. Sumner, the ship remained in reserve into the 1960s. She was sold for scrapping to the National Metal & Steel Corp., on 31 March 1964, for $52,609.15. She was removed from the fleet by the purchaser on 20 April 1964.

Military awards and honors 

Alkaid won one battle star for her World War II service.

References

Bibliography

External links
 

 

Crater-class cargo ships
World War II auxiliary ships of the United States
Ships built in Jacksonville, Florida
1943 ships
Suisun Bay Reserve Fleet